Card stock, also called cover stock and pasteboard, is paper that is thicker and more durable than normal writing and printing paper, but thinner and more flexible than other forms of paperboard.

Card stock is often used for business cards, postcards, playing cards, catalogue covers, scrapbooking, and other applications requiring more durability than regular paper gives. The surface usually is smooth; it may be textured, metallic, or glossy. When card stock is labeled cover stock, it often has a glossy coating on one or both sides (C1S or C2S, for "coated: one side" or "coated: two sides"); this is used especially in business cards and book covers.

Measurements

Most nations describe paper in terms of grammage—the weight in grams of one sheet of the paper measuring one square meter.

In describing paper, the pound is often symbolized by the pound symbol, #. Because of the difference in the way pound weight is determined, a sheet of 65# card stock is thicker and heavier than a sheet of 80# newsprint.

The weight of cardstock ranges from 50# to 110# (about 135 to 300 g/m2).

Rather than as a function of weight per sheet of a given area, paper thickness can be measured and stated directly, in units of linear measure. In the United States, this usually is expressed in thousandths of an inch, often abbreviated thou points (pt. and pts.) and mils. The thou point (1/1,000 inch) differs from the typographical point (1/12 traditional pica = exactly 0.01383 inch = 0.35136 mm).
 
The length and width of card stock often are stated in terms of the ISO system of paper sizes, in which specific dimensions are implied by numbers prefixed with the letter A. Card stock labeled A3, for example, measures 420 × 297 mm (16.5 × 11.7 in).

See also 
 Construction paper
 Paper density

References 

Paper
Printing terminology